Local ternary patterns (LTP) are an extension of local binary patterns (LBP). Unlike LBP, it does not threshold the pixels into 0 and 1, rather it uses a threshold constant to threshold pixels into three values. Considering k as the threshold constant, c as the value of the center pixel, a neighboring pixel p, the result of threshold is:

In this way, each thresholded pixel has one of the three values. Neighboring pixels are combined after thresholding into a ternary pattern. Computing a histogram of these ternary values will result in a large range, so the ternary pattern is split into two binary patterns. Histograms are concatenated to generate a descriptor double the size of LBP.

See also 
 Local binary patterns

References

Computer vision